North Carolina Highway 32 (NC 32) is a primary state highway in the U.S. state of North Carolina; it goes through several counties and small communities in the northeastern Inner Banks part of the state. The highway continues into Virginia as SR 32.

Route description

24.3 Miles in Beaufort County
31.7 Miles in Washington County
29.5 Miles in Chowan County
15.8 Miles in Gates County
101.3 Total Miles

History

Major intersections

References

External links

032
Transportation in Beaufort County, North Carolina
Transportation in Washington County, North Carolina
Transportation in Chowan County, North Carolina
Transportation in Gates County, North Carolina
Historic Albemarle Tour